H Abdur Raqeeb is a member of Central Advisory Council (Markazi Majlis-e-Shu'ra) of Jamaat-e-Islami Hind. He is the General Secretary of Indian Center for Islamic Finance and has been promoting the concept of interest-free banking throughout India. Raqeeb is also the Editor of Tamil fortnightly Samarasam.

Biography 
H Abdur Raqeeb was born in Vaniyambadi, currently stays in Chennai, Tamil Nadu. He has done B.Sc in Chemistry. He holds a Diploma in Leather Technology and completed M.A. in Journalism and Mass Communication.

He was into the leather industry for more than 25 years.

He was also editor to a weekly magazine in Tamil known as Samarasam. He was awarded 'The best Journalist Award' by Islamiya Tamil Islamic literary organisation. He was awarded 'The best Journalist Award' by Islamiya Tamil Ilakkiya Kazhagam (Tamil Islamic literary organisation) during the First State Conference of the organisation held at Trichirappalli on May 17–18.

He is associated with Jamaat-e-Islami Hind since 1981. He is the former Zonal President of Jamaat-e-Islami Hind, Tamil Nadu Zone.

Current associations 
 General Secretary, Indian Centre for Islamic Finance
 Convenor, National Committee on Islamic Banking
 Member, All India Muslim Personal Law board
 National Executive Member, Jamaat e Islami Hind
 President, Islami Baithul Maal, Vaniyambadi
 Member, Human Welfare Foundation, New Del
 Trustee, Sahulat Microfinance, New Delhi.
 General Secretary, Islamic Foundation Trust, Chennai
 Editor, Samarasam (Tamil – Fortnightly)
 Member, Board of Islamic Publications, New Delhi
 Executive Member, JAMIA Darussalam University, Oomerabad
 Executive Member, Vaniyambadi Muslim Educational Society

Islamic finance and banking-related activities  

 Interacted with Finance Minister, Governor of RBI, Deputy Governor RBI and Deputy Chairman Planning Commission to introduce the concept of Islamic banking in India
	Prepared along with experts a document for Banking Regulations (amendment) Bill to be introduced in Parliament as a private members bill.
	Prepared a document along with experts for Interest free windows along with conventional Banks and submitted to RBI and Finance Ministry.
	Interacted with High Level committee on Financial Sector reforms headed of Planning Commission of India by Dr Reghuram Rajan which mentioned about interest free banking.
	Highlighted in media –need and relevance of Islamic Finance and Banking
 He visited many countries to study the working methodology of Islamic banks and led a delegation of businessmen from Chennai to Malaysia.
  Attended several conferences in and outside India
 World Islamic Banking Conference at Bahrain
 IDB – Islamic finance conference on Sukuk in London, UK.
 Red Money Roadshow in Malaysia
 Chairman of the committee  which organized an international conference on Islamic banking  conducted by  Al Jamia Al islamiya in association with Islamic Research and Training Institute of Islamic Development Bank 
 He has attended many conferences and represented Jamaat-e-Islami Hind
 International Muslim Business Conference, Istanbul, Turkey.
 Led a delegation to Islamic Banks of Malaysia.

See also 
Jamaat-e-Islami Hind
Students Islamic Organisation of India
Maulana Maududi
Jalaluddin Umri

References 

Living people
Indian Muslims
Year of birth missing (living people)